Les gamins is a 2013 French comedy film.

Plot
Thomas is a young man who dreams of a career in music. Gilbert is the future father-in-law of Thomas, married to Suzanne for 30 years and father of Lola, the bride of Thomas. Tired of his life as a couple plan-plan, Gilbert decides one day to go to make again his life, pulling Thomas with him to avoid him to sink in the same routine. This new life of kids will allow them to live life in a new light, without the worries of everyday life, but also to create others.

Cast
 Alain Chabat : Gilbert
 Max Boublil : Thomas Brenner
 Sandrine Kiberlain : Suzanne
 Mélanie Bernier : Lola 
 Arié Elmaleh : Carl
 Elisa Sednaoui : Irène
 Alban Lenoir : Romain
 François Dunoyer : Claude
 Nicolas Briançon :  Bruno
 Mélusine Mayance : Mimi Zozo 
 Iggy Pop : Himself 
 Patrick Bruel : The Lookalike 
 Kheiron : Reza Sadeqi
 Sébastien Castro : Dédé
 Thomas Solivérès : Augustin
 Stéphane Custers : Jean-Marie

References

External links 
 

2013 comedy films
2013 films
French comedy films
Films set in France
2010s French films
Films with screenplays by Mona Achache